Pauline Harmange (born 1995) is a French feminist writer and a self-declared misandrist who became the subject of international news coverage after her 96-page essay Moi les hommes, je les déteste (2020) (English: I Hate Men) sold out its press run after a French governmental official attempted to censor the book.

In proposing a ban on the book, Ralph Zurmély, an adviser to France's ministry on gender equality, said the book was inciting gender-based hatred. "Now, let me remind you that incitement to hatred on the grounds of sex is a criminal offense! Consequently, I ask you to immediately remove this book from your catalog under penalty of prosecution," Zurmély emailed the publisher. The ministry subsequently distanced itself from the prosecution initiative, saying Zurmély conducted "a personal initiative and completely independent of the ministry".

I Hate Men

See more: I Hate Men

Originally intended as a run of 400 by micro publisher Monstrograph, the media attention caused the initial run to sell out, and 2,500 copies sold within two weeks of its release. Overwhelmed, Monstrograph auctioned reprint rights to French publisher Éditions du Seuil. The book has sold 20,000 copies since, along with translation rights for 17 languages.

The book was published in January 2021 in the U.S. as I Hate Men by HarperCollins.

Early life

Harmange began blogging at age 15 and publishes blog posts at her website .

Published works
Moi les hommes, je les déteste (I hate men), essay, 19 August 2020, Monstrograph

Limoges pour mourir (Limoges to die), ebook, 2020

Bibliography

References/Notes and references

Publisher page
 Monstrograph

External links
 https://uninvincibleete.com

Living people
French bloggers
French women bloggers
21st-century French women writers
Feminist theorists
French critics
French women critics
French feminists
Radical feminists
1994 births